This is a list of the governors of the province of Laghman, Afghanistan.

Governors of Laghman Province

See also
 List of current governors of Afghanistan

Notes

Laghman